The Turkish Economic and Social Studies Foundation (TESEV), based in Istanbul, is Turkey's leading think tank. The Turkish Economic and Social Studies Foundation (TESEV) is an independent non-governmental think-tank, analyzing social, political and economic policy issues facing Turkey. It is known for its liberal economic views hostile to state intervention.

Based in Istanbul, TESEV was founded in 1994 to serve as a bridge between academic research and policy-making process in Turkey. By opening new channels for policy-oriented dialogue and research, TESEV aims to promote the role of civil society in the democratic process and seeks to share its research findings with the widest possible audience. In order to do so, TESEV organizes regular seminars and conferences, bringing together specialists and policymakers from Turkey and abroad to discuss issues of current concern. It releases project reports, books, pamphlets, policy watch briefings and seminar proceedings aimed at general readership.

TESEV focuses on the most urgent and important policy questions facing Turkey and its neighbourhood in the new century. Program areas are grouped under three headings: Democratization, Foreign Policy and Good Governance

Some of the most remarkable of TESEV's work have been on the issues of Islam and democracy, combating corruption, state reform, and transparency and accountability. Among the ongoing project areas are security sector reform, minorities and citizenship rights, transparency and strengthening civil society as well as Cyprus, Middle East and North Africa, and Turkey and European Union relations.

References

External links 

 Arin, Kubilay Yado Turkish Think Tanks, the AKP’s Policy Network from Neo-Gramscian and Neo-Ottoman Angles Portland State University, Center for Turkish Studies, Occasional Paper Series, June 2015.

Think tanks based in Turkey
1994 establishments in Turkey
Think tanks established in 1994
Organizations based in Istanbul